Sahmui, also rendered as Sahmu and Sahmoo, may refer to:
 Sahmui-ye Jonubi
 Sahmui-ye Shomali